The Colborne Cramahe Hawks were a Canadian Junior ice hockey team based in Colborne, Ontario. The Hawks were members of the World United Hockey League.

Competing in the Greater Metro Junior 'A' Hockey League from 2007 until 2014, the Hawks originated as the Douro Dukes of Douro, Ontario in 2007. From 2008 until 2014, the team was known as the Bucks from Beaverton, Ontario and later Bobcaygeon, Ontario.

History
The Douro Dukes were one of six expansion teams for the 2007–08 GMHL season.

On September 6, 2007, the Douro Dukes played their first-ever game at the Ennismore Arena against the Innisfil Lakers. John Minarik made 27 saves to record the Dukes first victory and first-ever shutout by a score of 2–0. Tony DeCarlo scored both the first and second goal in franchise history in the third period of this very close contest.

After a strong start to the season, the Dukes lost many of their key players to defections to other clubs including: Guy Wallace, Brad Meyers, Mike Banelopoulos, Andrew Bobas, John Minark and Mike Madgett. The Dukes won two of their first four games, beating Innisfil and the Nipissing Alouettes, but the bottom dropped out and the Dukes went on a horrid 38-game losing streak. Despite this, the Dukes ended up facing the King Wild in the first round of the playoffs. They kept the first game close, and games two, three, and four close until the third period, but the previous year's finalists swept the series 4 games to none.

In April 2008, it was announced that the Dukes had moved to become the Warsaw Redmen, but a month later it was disclosed that the team would instead move to Beaverton, Ontario and would be called the Brock Bucks.

On September 14, 2008, the Brock Bucks played their first ever game since relocation. The game was against the Minden Riverkings in Minden Hills. The Bucks won 7–5 which snapped the longest running multi-season losing streak in the GMHL at 38 losses. This win was the franchise's first win since September 22, 2007.

In the summer of 2010, it was announced that the team was moving to Bobcaygeon and becoming the Bobcaygeon Bucks.

In the Spring of 2014, the team announced that after four seasons in the GMHL the team would relocate to Colborne, Ontario as members of the newly formed Canadian International Hockey League. The Hawks, after nine games would find themselves in seventh place out of eight teams. In mid-November, the Hawks left the CIHL with four other teams, but before they could join the other teams in a new league they were locked out of their arena over unpaid bills and forced to temporarily cease operations. The team reorganized and joined the new World United Hockey League with the former CIHL teams.

Season-by-season standings

Playoffs
2008
King Wild defeated Douro Dukes 4-games-to-none in bye round
2009
South Muskoka Shield defeated Brock Bucks 3-games-to-none in division quarter-final
2010
Bradford Rattlers defeated Brock Bucks 3-games-to-none in quarter-final
2011
Deseronto Storm defeated Bobcaygeon Bucks 2-games-to-none in qualifier
2012
Elliot Lake Bobcats defeated Bobcaygeon Bucks 2-games-to-1 in bye round
2013
Bobcaygeon Bucks defeated Toronto Attack 3-games-to-2 in division quarter-final
Bradford Rattlers defeated Bobcaygeon Bucks 3-games-to-none in division semi-final
2014
Bobcaygeon Bucks beat Sturgeon Falls Lumberjacks 9-8 in qualifier
Seguin Huskies defeated Bobcaygeon Bucks 3-games-to-none in division quarter-final
2015
St. Charles North Stars defeated Colborne Cramahe Hawks 2-games-to-none in semi-final

Notable alumni
Nikolai Skladnichenko

References

External links
@ColborneHawks
WUHL Official website

Ice hockey teams in Ontario
2007 establishments in Ontario